Thomas Joseph Costello (February 23, 1929 – February 15, 2019) was an American prelate of the Catholic Church  who served as an auxiliary bishop of Roman Catholic Diocese of Syracuse.

Born in Camden, New York, Costello was ordained to the priesthood on June 5, 1954, at the Cathedral of the Immaculate Conception and served as a priest for 24 years before being consecrated a bishop on March 13, 1978.  In addition to serving as auxiliary bishop of Syracuse, he was also named Titular Bishop of 'Precides."

In the years before being elevated to bishop, Costello received the title of monsignor from Pope Paul VI in 1965.

He retired on March 23, 2004.  He died on February 15, 2019.

See also
 

 Catholic Church hierarchy
 Catholic Church in the United States
 Historical list of the Catholic bishops of the United States
 List of Catholic bishops of the United States
 Lists of patriarchs, archbishops, and bishops

References

External links
 Roman Catholic Diocese of Syracuse Official Site

1929 births
2019 deaths
People from Camden, New York
20th-century Roman Catholic bishops in the United States
21st-century Roman Catholic bishops in the United States
Roman Catholic bishops of Syracuse